Stephen Allkins, known professionally as [Love] Tattoo is an Australian DJ and music producer. He is best known for his 2001 single "Bass Has Got Me Movin'".

Career
In 1999, [Love] Tattoo released his debut single "History of Disco" on Essential Recordings. This was followed by the double A sided single "Drums"/"Bass" on Hussle Recordings.

In April 2001, [Love] Tattoo released "Bass Has Got Me Movin'", which peaked at number 56 on the ARIA Charts.
At the ARIA Music Awards of 2001, "Bass Has Got Me Movin'", was nominated for the Best Dance Release. His debut album, [Love] Tattoo was released in 2001 and at the ARIA Music Awards of 2002, [Love] Tattoo was also nominated for Best Dance Release.

In 2005, [Love] Tattoo released his second studio album, Body Work.

Discography

Albums

Singles

Awards and nominations

ARIA Music Awards

|-
|2001
|"Bass Has Got Me Movin'"
| ARIA Award for Best Dance Release
| 
|-
|2002
|[Love] Tattoo
| ARIA Award for Best Dance Release
| 
|-

References

Living people
Year of birth missing (living people)
21st-century Australian musicians
21st-century Australian male musicians